Pluviôse (also Pluviose) was the fifth month in the French Republican Calendar. The month was named after the Latin word pluviosus, which means rainy.

Pluviôse was the second month of the winter quarter (mois d'hiver), starting between the 20th and 22 January, and ending between the 18th and 20 February. It follows the Nivôse and precedes the Ventôse.

On October 24, 1793 Fabre d'Églantine suggested new names for the French Republican Calendar and on the 24th November the National Convention accepted the names with minor changes. It was decided to omit the circumflex (accent circonflexe) in the names of the winter months, so the month was named Pluviose instead of Pluviôse. However, in historiography the spelling
Pluviôse is still preferred.

Day name table 

Like all FRC months Pluviôse lasted 30 days and was divided into three 10-day weeks called décades (decades). Each day had the name of an agricultural plant, except the 5th (Quintidi) and 10th day (Decadi) of every decade, which had the name of a domestic animal (Quintidi) or an agricultural tool (Decadi).

Conversion table

External links 
 Winter Quarter of Year II (facsimile)

French Republican calendar
January
February

sv:Franska revolutionskalendern#Månaderna